More than 90% of the population of Azerbaijan is Muslim. (Estimates include 96.9% Muslim, 93.4% (Berkley Center, 2012), 99.2% (Pew Research Center, 2009).) The rest of the population adheres to other faiths or are non-religious, although they are not officially represented. Among the Muslim majority, religious observance varies and Muslim identity tends to be based more on culture and ethnicity rather than religion. The Muslim population is approximately 60-65% Shi'a and 35-40% Sunni; differences traditionally have not been defined sharply.

Most Shias are adherents of orthodox Ithna Ashari school of Shi'a Islam. Other traditional religions or beliefs that are followed by many in the country are the Hanafi school of Sunni Islam. Traditionally villages around Baku and Lenkoran region are considered stronghold of Shi'ism. In some northern regions, populated by Sunni Dagestani (Lezghian) people, the Salafi movement gained some following. Folk Islam is widely practiced.

According to a 2010 Gallup Poll found 49% of Azerbaijanis answering no to the question "Is religion an important part of your daily life?", one of the highest rates among any Muslim-majority country.  A 1998 poll estimated the proportion of ardent believers in Azerbaijan at only 20 percent.

History
Islam arrived in Azerbaijan with Arabs in the seventh century, gradually supplanting Christianity and pagan cults.

In the sixteenth century, the first shah of the Safavid Dynasty, Ismail I (r. 1486-1524), established Shi'a Islam as the state religion, although a portion of people remained Sunni. The population of what is nowadays Iran and what is nowadays Azerbaijan were converted to Shia Islam at the same moment in history.

As elsewhere in the Muslim world, the two branches of Islam came into conflict in Azerbaijan. Enforcement of Shi'a Islam as the state religion brought contention between the Safavid rulers and the ruling Sunnis of the neighboring Ottoman Empire.

In the nineteenth century, many Sunni Muslims emigrated from Russian-controlled Azerbaijan because of Russia's series of wars with their coreligionists in the Ottoman Empire. Thus, by the late nineteenth century, the Shi'a population was in the majority in Russian Azerbaijan. Antagonism between the Sunnis and the Shi'a diminished in the late nineteenth century as Azerbaijani nationalism began to emphasize a common Turkic heritage and opposition to Iranian religious influences.

Russian Empire and Soviet Union

In 1806, Azerbaijan became occupied by the Russian Empire as the latter invaded Qajar Iran during the Russo-Persian War (1804-1813). In the aftermath, Iran was forced to cede therefore almost all of Azerbaijan according to the Treaty of Gulistan of 1813 to Russia. However, all this only came to be confirmed in the aftermath of the next and last war between Russia and Iran, the Russo-Persian War (1826-1828) and the resulting Treaty of Turkmenchay of 1828. In 1918, Azerbaijan declared independence from Russia and established the Azerbaijan Democratic Republic under its leading Musavat party, but was incorporated into the Soviet Union in 1920.

Before Soviet power was established, about 2,000 mosques were active in Azerbaijan. Most mosques were closed in the 1930s, then some were allowed to reopen during World War II. The Soviet rule promoted an Azerbaijani national consciousness as a substitute for identification with the world Islamic community and Iran.

During World War II, Soviet authorities established the Muslim Spiritual Board of Transcaucasia in Baku as the governing body of Islam in the Caucasus, in effect reviving the nineteenth-century tsarist Muslim Ecclesiastical Board. During the tenures of Leonid Brezhnev and Mikhail Gorbachev, Moscow encouraged Muslim religious leaders in Azerbaijan to visit and host foreign Muslim leaders, with the goal of advertising the freedom of religion and superior living conditions reportedly enjoyed by Muslims under Soviet communism.

During the Azerbaijani SSR, there were 17 mosques functioning in the country. In the 1980s only two large and five smaller mosques held services in Baku, and only eleven others were operating in the rest of the country. Supplementing the officially sanctioned mosques were thousands of private houses of prayer and many secret Islamic sects.

The lone center of conservative Shia Islam, was the town of Nardaran, 25 kilometers northeast of central Baku, and was renowned for its thirteenth-century Shia shrine. Unlike the rest of the country which was staunchly secular and which can be considered religiously progressive, Nardaran was the only place in the whole of Azerbaijan where its inhabitants are devoutly religious and fundamentalist, where its streets display religious banners and where most women wear chadors in public. The now banned Islamic Party of Azerbaijan was founded in this town and its base was centered there.

There is some evidence of Sufism in Azerbaijan.

After the Soviet Union

Beginning in the late Gorbachev period, and especially after independence, the number of mosques rose dramatically. Many were built with the support of other Islamic countries, such as Iran, Oman, and Saudi Arabia, which also contributed Qur'ans and religious instructors to the new Muslim states. A Muslim seminary has also been established since 1991. The growing number of religious Muslims resulted in the establishment of more than 2,000 mosques by 2014.

After independence, the laws regarding religion are quite clear. In Article 7 of the constitution, Azerbaijan is declared a secular state. This point is driven home in Article 19 with the statement of the separation of religion and state and the equality of all religions before the law as well as the secular character of the state educational system.

Azerbaijan has been a secular country. A 1998 survey estimated the proportion of ardent believers in Azerbaijan at close to 7 percent, slightly more than the number of declared atheists — almost 4 percent — with the largest numbers falling into the category of those who consider Islam above all as a way of life, without strict observance of prohibitions and requirements, or as a fundamental part of national identity.  In a 2010 survey only half of Azerbaijanis answering yes to the question, "Is religion an important part of your daily life?"

Radical Islam

There is a certain rise of religious extremism across Azerbaijan as a result of continued problems such as corruption, poverty, and government rule, combined with disillusionment with the West and support of religious sects from different countries. However it works against a headwind of traditional secularism. According to Svante Cornell:

Azerbaijan can rightly claim to be among the most progressive and secular Islamic societies. Aside from having been the first Muslim country to have operas, theater plays, and a democratic republic, Azerbaijan today is among the Muslim countries where support for secularism is the highest, and where radical ideologies have met only very limited interest.

Svante Cornell believes that the radical groups remain weak, but have a potential to grow under the current domestic and international circumstances. To confront this, the Azerbaijani state needs to address the diarchy in terms of supervision of religious structures. He writes, that the Government policies toward Islam in general and Islamic radicalism in particular have been inadequate.

According to researchers Emil Souleimanov and Maya Ehrmann, there is "a trend among Dagestani minorities in the north of Azerbaijan to engage in insurgent activities".  The Salafi movement has been "spurred by missionary activities using external funds and the establishment of mosques", and found support from those who the desire a return to more traditionalist values. As authorities have  repressed Salafis in the north they have become more radical.

Citizens of Azerbaijan have joined terrorist organizations in Syria.

In Nardaran, a deadly incident broke out between Azerbaijan security forces and religious Shia residents in which two policemen and four suspected Shia Muslim militants were killed.

As a result of this incident, the Azerbaijani parliament passed laws prohibiting people with religious education received abroad to implement Islamic rites and ceremonies in Azerbaijan, as well as to preach in mosques and occupy leading positions in the country; as well as prohibiting the display of religious paraphernalia, flags and slogans, except in places of worship, religious centers and offices. Ashura commemorations in public have also been banned. The Azerbaijani government also passed a law to remove the citizenship of Azerbaijani citizens who fight abroad.

See also
Religion in Azerbaijan
State Committee for Work with Religious Organizations of Azerbaijan Republic
Islam by country
2007 Baku terrorist plot

Further reading
  
  Pdf.
  Pdf.
 
 
 
   Online

References

Notes

External links
ISLAMIC AND ETHNIC IDENTITIES IN AZERBAIJAN: EMERGING TRENDS AND TENSIONS, A Discussion Paper, by Hema Kotecha, OSCE, 2006 
Azerbaijan: Islam in a post-soviet republic. By Anar Valiyev, CAEI
Azerbaijan: Islamic threat to religious harmony, Open Democracy News 

 
Azerbaijan
Azerbaijan